Pettendorf is a municipality  in the district of Regensburg in Bavaria in Germany.

The river Naab empties into the Danube in the municipality.

References

Regensburg (district)